Grayson County is a county in the U.S. state of Texas. As of the 2020 census, its population was 135,543. The county seat is Sherman. The county was founded in 1846 and is named after Peter Wagener Grayson, an attorney general of the Republic of Texas. Grayson County is included in the Sherman-Denison metropolitan statistical area, which is also included in the Dallas-Fort Worth-Arlington, combined statistical area. Located on the state's border with Oklahoma, it is part of the Texoma region, with proximity to Lake Texoma and the Red River.

History 
The earliest known inhabitants of what is now Grayson County were Caddo Amerindian groups, including Tonkawa, Ionis, and Kichai. These groups engaged in agriculture and traded with Spanish and French colonists at trading posts along the Red River. Trading posts were established at Preston Bend on the Red River, Warren, and Pilot Grove during 1836 and 1837.

After the establishment of the Peters Colony in the early 1840s, settlement near the Red River increased. Grayson County was created from Fannin County by the Texas State Legislature on March 17, 1846.  The county seat, Sherman, was also designated by the Texas State Legislature.

In the 1850s, trading and marketing at Preston Bend became more important, as agriculture expanded in the county. This was helped by Preston Road, the first trail in the state. It went from Preston Bend to Austin, Texas. More growth occurred after the establishment of Sherman as a station of the  Butterfield Overland Mail route in 1856.

Opinions in the county about secession were divided. County residents voted by more than two to one in 1861 against secession, desiring to remain in the Union. The Great Hanging at Gainesville in nearby Cooke County in October 1862 was an attack on dissenters, men who were suspected of resisting conscription and having been Unionists. After 150-200 men were arrested by state troops, the military organized a so-called "Citizens Court", which had no basis in state law. Its jury made up its own rules and convicted and sentenced more than 25 men to death by hanging. Another 14 were lynched outright by a mob without even the cover of a trial. A total of 42 men were killed in the proceedings that month, considered the largest vigilante murders in U.S. history.

Violence continued for a time in Sherman and other towns of North Texas, at times at the hands of Confederate military. E. Junius Foster, the editor of the Patriot newspaper, was murdered in 1862 by Capt. Jim Young, son of Col. William Young, who had been killed in Cooke County. The senior Young had organized the Citizens Court that put so many men to death, and Foster had "applauded" Young's death. When other men were rounded up as suspect Unionists in Sherman, Brig. General James W. Throckmorton intervened and saved all but five who had already been lynched.

Men from Grayson County served the Confederacy at locations in the South. The 11th Texas Cavalry Regiment captured federal forts in the Indian Territory north of the Red River.

Grayson County and much of Texas suffered economic depression in the postwar years during the Reconstruction era, based in part on difficulties in reliance on agriculture in the South, adjustments to free labor, and other problems. The driving of cattle herds north along Preston Road provided needed income for the county during this period.

After the Houston & Texas Central (now UPRR) and Katy railroads began operating in the county in 1872, settlement in Grayson County picked up and flourished during the 1870s and 1880s. Cotton plantations were developed to cultivate this as the predominant commodity crop. Many towns, including Denison, Van Alstyne, Howe, Whitewright, Pottsboro, and Tom Bean, were founded during this time.

In 1879, a group of settlers who had settled in North Texas both before and after statehood came together in Grayson County for political discussions. They formed the Old Settlers Association of North Texas. The association accepted donations and purchased 26 acres. They continued to meet on an annual basis for many years.

On May 15, 1896, a tornado measuring F5 on the Fujita scale struck Sherman. About 50 homes were destroyed, with 20 of them being obliterated.

20th century to present
During the Sherman Riot of 1930 (May 9, 1930), Grayson County's 1876 courthouse was burned down by a white mob that rioted during the trial of George Hughes, an African-American man. When the riot started, Hughes was locked by police in the vault at the courthouse, and died in the fire. After rioters retrieved Hughes' body from the vault, they dragged it behind a car, hanged it, and set afire. Texas Ranger Frank Hamer was in Grayson County during this riot, and reported the situation to Texas Governor Dan Moody. Governor Moody sent National Guard troops to Grayson County on May 9 and more on May 10 to control the situation. Grayson County's current courthouse was completed in 1936.

The Bridge War, also called the Red River Bridge War or the Toll Bridge War, was a 1931 bloodless boundary conflict between the U.S. states of Oklahoma and Texas over an existing toll bridge and a new free bridge crossing the Red River between Grayson County, Texas, and Bryan County, Oklahoma.

In 1938, construction of a dam on the Red River was authorized by the U.S. Congress. The dam's construction was completed in part by the use of labor provided by German prisoners-of-war held at Camp Howze, in adjacent Cooke County during World War II. The dam is now known as Denison Dam. Lake Texoma was formed behind it and is used for recreation, irrigation, and electrical power generation.

Perrin Air Force Base was constructed in 1941. The base closure in 1971 was a blow to the county economy; however, the availability of skilled labor formerly associated with the base helped attract industrial plants. In addition, the base was converted to a civilian airport: North Texas Regional Airport - Perrin Field.

The Eisenhower Birthplace State Historic Site, which is the birthplace of Dwight D. Eisenhower in Denison, was acquired and restored in 1952. Since 1993, the site is no longer maintained by the state, because of budget cuts, but it is maintained by a private nonprofit organization.

Grayson County is the only county in Texas where "deer may only be hunted with bows, no matter the season", according to an article by Thomas Phillips in the April 10, 2009, issue of Lone Star Outdoor News.

Geography

Major highways

  U.S. Highway 69
  U.S. Highway 75
  U.S. Highway 82
  U.S. Highway 377

  State Highway 5
  State Highway 11
  State Highway 56
  State Highway 91
  State Highway 160
  State Highway 289
  Spur 503

Adjacent counties
 Marshall County, Oklahoma (north)
 Bryan County, Oklahoma (northeast)
 Fannin County (east)
 Collin County (south)
 Denton County (southwest)
 Cooke County (west)
 Love County, Oklahoma (northwest)

National protected area
 Hagerman National Wildlife Refuge

Demographics

Note: the US Census treats Hispanic/Latino as an ethnic category. This table excludes Latinos from the racial categories and assigns them to a separate category. Hispanics/Latinos can be of any race.

As of the census of 2000, 110,595 people, 42,849 households, and 30,208 families resided in the county.  The population density was 118 people per square mile (46/km2).  The 48,315 housing units  averaged 52 per square mile (20/km2).  The racial makeup of the county was 87.20% White, 5.85% Black or African American, 1.31% Native American, 0.57% Asian, 0.05% Pacific Islander, 2.90% from other races, and 2.13% from two or more races;  6.80% of the population were Hispanic or Latino of any race.

Of the 42,849 households, 32.10% had children under the age of 18 living with them, 55.20% were married couples living together, 11.40% had a female householder with no husband present, and 29.50% were not families. About 25.50% of all households were made up of individuals, and 11.40% had someone living alone who was 65 years of age or older.  The average household size was 2.51 and the average family size was 3.00.

In the county, the population was distributed as 25.30% under the age of 18, 9.30% from 18 to 24, 27.60% from 25 to 44, 22.80% from 45 to 64, and 15.10% who were 65 years of age or older.  The median age was 37 years. For every 100 females, there were 94.00 males.  For every 100 females age 18 and over, there were 90.60 males.

The median income for a household in the county was $37,178, and for a family was $45,048. Males had a median income of $32,998 versus $23,414 for females. The per capita income for the county was $18,862.  About 8.40% of families and 11.30% of the population were below the poverty line, including 13.80% of those under age 18 and 10.10% of those age 65 or over.

Communities

Cities

 Bells
 Denison
 Dorchester
 Gunter
 Knollwood
 Pottsboro
 Sadler
 Sherman (county seat)
 Southmayd
 Trenton (mostly in Fannin County)
 Van Alstyne (small part in Collin County)
 Whitesboro

Towns

 Collinsville
 Howe
 Tioga
 Tom Bean
 Whitewright (small part in Fannin County)

Census-designated places
 Preston
 Sherwood Shores

Unincorporated communities
 Ambrose
 Carpenter's Bluff
 Gordonville
 Luella

Politics

See also

 List of museums in North Texas
 National Register of Historic Places listings in Grayson County, Texas
 Recorded Texas Historic Landmarks in Grayson County

References

External links

 Grayson County government's website
 Grayson County in Handbook of Texas Online at the University of Texas
 Grayson County historical materials, hosted by the Portal to Texas History.
 Minutes of the Old Settler's Association of Grayson County, 1879-1998 hosted by the Portal to Texas History.
 Grayson County; an illustrated history of Grayson County, Texas., by Graham Landrum, hosted by the Portal to Texas History
 A history of Grayson County, Texas / Mattie Davis Lucas (Mrs. W. H. Lucas) and Mita Holsapple Hall (Mrs. H. E. Hall), hosted by the Portal to Texas History

 
1846 establishments in Texas
Populated places established in 1846